Braut is a surname. Notable people with the surname include:

Arne Braut (born 1950), Norwegian politician
Christian Braut (born 1962), French singer-songwriter
Frigga Braut (1889–1975), German actress
Ivar Braut (born 1956), Norwegian theologian and Lutheran bishop
Marija Braut (1929–2015), Croatian photographer